Hong Kong Football Association Chairman's Cup 2007-08 is the 33rd staging of the competition. The reserve teams of the 9 First Division League clubs and Hong Kong C Team entered the competition.

Bracket
All times are Hong Kong Time (UTC+8).

Bracket

First round

Quarter-finals

Semi-finals

Final

Top Scorers

References

See also
 2007/2008 Hong Kong Football Association Chairman's Cup

HKFA Chairman's Cup
2008 domestic association football cups
Cha